Aleksandr Ivanovich Krinitsky (1894, Tver – 1937) was a Soviet statesman and first secretary of the Communist Party of the Byelorussian SSR from May 1924 to December 1925.

Early life and Revolution 
Born in Tver, the eldest son in the family of an employee of the provincial chancellery. He graduated from the Tver gymnasium with a gold medal (1912).

He studied at the St. Petersburg Polytechnic Institute in 1912 however he did not graduate. He later Studied at the Physics and Mathematics Faculty of Moscow University.

In 1915 Krinitsky he joined the Bolsheviks and carried on propaganda and agitation among students of Moscow University, from which he was expelled and arrested in 1915. He was sentenced to eternal settlement in Eastern Siberia. But on 6 (19) March 1917, he was amnestied and released. After his release, he was actively involved in revolutionary work.

In the Soviet Union 
In September 1924 to May 1927 in the Byelorussian SSR : The Secretary, in December 1925 with the 1st Secretary of the Communist Party of Belarussia (Bolsheviks). In Belarus, A. Krynitsky, as a typical representative of the party elite, implemented the idea of strengthening the USSR as a single highly centralized union state, command and administrative management of the economy, and a complete monopoly on the power of the Communist Party. At the same time, he was influenced by the strong in the 1920s local national-oriented wing of the Communist Party of Belarussia. 

From May 1927 he was head of the Propaganda Department of the Central Committee of the All-Union Communist Party (Agitprop). From 1929 - secretary of the Transcaucasian Regional Committee of the UCP (b), then deputy people's commissar of the RSI USSR, also a member of the editorial board of the magazine "Bolshevik". deputy head of the agricultural department (b), since 1933 - Head of the Political Department and Deputy People's Commissar of the USSR and Secretary of the Saratov Regional Committee of the Party. 

During the Great Purge, he was arrested on 20 July 1937, removed from the Central Committee and Orgburo on 12 October 1937, sentenced to death on 29 October 1937 and executed the next day.

Krinitsky was rehabilitated on 17 March 1956.

References

1894 births
1937 deaths
People from Tver
People from Tverskoy Uyezd
Old Bolsheviks
Central Committee of the Communist Party of the Soviet Union members
Heads of the Communist Party of Byelorussia
Great Purge victims from Russia
Executed politicians
Soviet rehabilitations
Head of Propaganda Department of CPSU CC
First Secretaries of the Communist Party of the Transcaucasian SFSR